Mihail Jora (2 August 1891, Roman, Romania - 10 May 1971, Bucharest, Romania) was a Romanian composer, pianist, and conductor.
Jora studied in Leipzig with Robert Teichmüller. From 1929 to 1962 he was a professor at the Bucharest Conservatoire. He worked from 1928 to 1933 as a director/conductor of the Bucharest Broadcasting Orchestra. In 1944 he became vice-president of the Society of Romanian Composers: however, he soon came into criticism of the new communist government being accused of formalism (see Zhdanov Doctrine). In 1953, he was rehabilitated and allowed to rejoin the Composers' Union.

He composed six ballets, one symphony, two major orchestra works, and many pieces for piano, chamber-music, choral and vocal music.

References

1891 births
1971 deaths
Armenian composers
Romanian composers
Armenian conductors (music)
Romanian people of Armenian descent
University of Music and Theatre Leipzig alumni
Academic staff of the National University of Music Bucharest
Recipients of the Order of the Star of the Romanian Socialist Republic
20th-century conductors (music)
20th-century composers
Herder Prize recipients